Agni Gundam is a 1984 Telugu film directed by Kranthi Kumar. The film stars Chiranjeevi, Sumalatha and Silk Smitha in important roles.

Plot
Vijay, a factory worker, exposes the misdeeds of Satyam but as revenge, Satyam gets his brother, Chinna, married to Latha, Vijay's lover. Later, Chinna gets killed and Vijay is arrested for it.

Cast
 Chiranjeevi
 Sumalatha
 Raogopal Rao
 Sujatha
 Sarath Babu
 Nutan Prasad
 Silk Smitha
 Athili Lakshmi
 Suthi Veerabhadra Rao
 Suthi Velu
 Rallapalli
 Uday Kumar
 Rajiv
 Rajasekhar Reddy
 Raju
 B. Isaac Prabhakar
 Telephone Satyanarayana
 Madan Mohan

Crew
 Dialogues: Satyanand
 Lyrics: Veturi
 Playback Singers: S. P. Balasubrahmanyam, P. Susheela & S. P. Sailaja
 Stunts: Raju
 Art Director: Bhaskar Raju
 Dances: Saleem
 Operative Cameraman: K. V. Ramana
 Associate Director: Nagandla
 Chief Associate Director: Vankineni Ratna Pratap
 Co-director: Jayakumar Kanagala
 Editor: B. Krishnam Raju
 Cinematographer: A. Venkat
 Music: K. Chakravarthy
 Producer: Kranthi Kumar

Production Companies
 Production Company: Sri Kranthi Chitra
 Studios: Prasad Studios, Vauhini Studios, AVM Studios, Arunachalam Studios & Karpagam Studios
 Outdoor Unit: Sarada Enterprises, Sri Bhramarambika Outdoor Unit
 Processing & Printing: Prasad Color Laboratories
 Poster Printing: National Litho Printers

Soundtrack
The music was composed by K. Chakravarthy

External links

1984 films
Films scored by K. Chakravarthy
1980s Telugu-language films
Films directed by Kranthi Kumar